The HTC Wizard (also known as the HTC Prodigy and the HTC P4300) is an Internet-enabled Windows Mobile Pocket PC smartphone designed by High Tech Computer Corporation of Taiwan. It has a touchscreen with a left-side slide-out QWERTY keyboard. The Wizard's functions include those of a camera phone and a portable media player in addition to text messaging and multimedia messaging. It also offers Internet services including e-mail, instant messaging, web browsing, and local Wi-Fi connectivity. It is a quad-band GSM phone with GPRS and EDGE. There are variants which differ in the design of the case, the keyboard and the presence of an on-board camera. On AT&T/Cingular, the Wizard was superseded by the HTC TyTN, known as the AT&T/Cingular 8525. On T-Mobile USA, the Wizard was superseded by the HTC P4350, known as the T-Mobile Wing.

Versions
Besides the branding differences, there are several models of the HTC Wizard. The Wizard 100 model has a squared design with square keys. The Wizard 110 model is physically similar to the 100 model, and contains the same technical features, with the exception of a camera. The Wizard 200 model is the most common model, and has a rounded design with rounded keys.

The Wizard model was sold as:
HTC Wizard 100
Cingular 8100 (US)
HTC Wizard 110
Cingular 8125 (US)
Dopod 838 (Asia)
HTC P4300
Qtek A9100 (Latin America)
Vodafone VPA Compact II
HTC Wizard 200
i-mate K-Jam (Middle East)
O2 Xda Mini Pro
O2 Xda Mini S (Europe)
Orange (brand) SPV M3000 (Europe)
Qtek 9100 (Europe)
T-Mobile MDA (US)
T-Mobile MDA Vario (Europe)

ROM updates
Official ROM updates are or were available for several versions of the Wizard, including the Cingular 8125 (AKU 2.2.0), the Dopod 838, the i-mate K-Jam (AKU 2.0.0), the O2 XDA Mini S (AKU 2.0.0), the Qtek 9100 (AKU 2.0.0), the T-Mobile MDA US (AKU 2.3.0), and the T-Mobile MDA Vario. These ROM updates often include a new adaptation kit upgrade which adds features and fixes bugs.

Unofficial and unsupported updates to Windows Mobile 6.5 exist. However, a Wizard must be Carrier Identification (CID) unlocked before flashing to one of these ROMs or flashing to another carrier's ROM (for example, flashing a T-Mobile MDA with a ROM for the Cingular 8125). There are two models of the Wizard: G3 and G4. The procedures for CID and SIM unlocking each model are different. Following the wrong procedure or attempting to flash a Wizard that has not been CID unlocked could result in a permanently inoperable phone.

Specifications

Screen size: 
Screen resolution: 240×320 pixels at 143 ppi, with 4:3 aspect ratio
Screen colors: 65,536 (16-bit)
Input devices: Touchscreen interface and slide-out QWERTY keyboard
Battery: 1250 mAh, user-accessible
Battery has up to 5 hours of talk and up to 200 hours of standby.
1.3 megapixel camera with fixed lens, LED flash, and self-portrait mirror
Location finding by detection of cell towers and Wi-Fi networks (through Google Maps Mobile)
TI OMAP 850 (195 MHz ARM 926EJ-S processor)
RAM: 64 MB DRAM
ROM: 128 MB flash memory
Removable Media: miniSD, up to 4 GB (Non High Capacity Card)
Operating System: Windows Mobile 5.0
Quad band GSM / GPRS / EDGE Class 10 (GSM 850, GSM 900, GSM 1800, GSM 1900)
Wi-Fi (802.11b/g)
Bluetooth 2.0
Mini USB (device-mode only, no host)
2.5mm stereo headphone jack
IrDA
Size:  (h),  (w),  (d)
Weight: Wizard 100 , Wizard 110 , Wizard 200

Alternative operating system support
In 2006 the Linwizard Project was started with the aim of replacing Windows Mobile with Embedded Linux and a GPE/OPIE window manager.  The Linux kernel has been successfully booted, and Kdrive (X Windowing system) runs.  The linwizard team is currently in the process of adding driver support for the various devices present in the Wizard. The latest devices working include the touchscreen and a GSM driver.

See also
HTC Atlas (T-Mobile Wing US)
HTC TyTN (AT&T 8525)
HTC TyTN II (AT&T 8925/Tilt)
HTC Touch Pro

References

External links

HTC official website

Mobile phones introduced in 2005
Digital audio players
Wizard
Windows Mobile Professional devices
Mobile phones with an integrated hardware keyboard